Twin Forks is a census-designated place in Otero County, New Mexico, United States. Its population was 196 as of the 2010 census. U.S. Route 82 passes through the community.

Demographics

Education
It is in Cloudcroft Municipal Schools.

References

Census-designated places in New Mexico
Census-designated places in Otero County, New Mexico